One Last Chance may refer to:

 One Last Chance, a 1990 installment of the British anthology TV series Screen One
 One Last Chance, a 2004 film featuring Iain Robertson
 "One Last Chance", a 2009 song by Daughtry from Leave This Town
 "One Last Chance", a 2007 song by James Morrison from Undiscovered

See also 
 Last Chance (disambiguation)